Artyom is a male given name common in Russia and other Slavic-speaking countries. The name uses the "ё" letter, which can be transcribed to English as "e" but still has the "yo" sound. The Belarusian spelling is Арцём. A common diminutive form of the name is Tyoma (Тёма).

The name is derived from the Ancient Greek name Artemios (Greek: Αρτέμιος), the name of the saint Artemius, derived from the name of the goddess Artemis.

Notable people
Artyom, nickname of Fyodor Sergeyev (1883–1921), Soviet revolutionary of Donets basin
Artyom Abramov, Russian footballer
Artyom Alikhanian, Soviet Armenian physicist
Artyom Alimov, Russian footballer
Artyom Anisimov, Russian footballer
Artyom Antipov, Russian footballer
Artyom Arefyev, Russian athlete
Artyom Argokov, Kazakhstani ice hockey player
Artyom Beketov, Russian footballer
Artyom Bezrodny, Russian footballer
Artyom Bludnov, Russian footballer
Artyom Bogucharsky, Russian actor 
Artyom Borovik, Russian journalist
Artyom Chernov, Russian ice hockey player
Artyom Danilenko, Russian footballer
Artyom Delkin, Russian footballer
Artyom Drobyshev, Russian footballer
Artyom Dudolev, Russian footballer
Artyom Dzyuba, Russian footballer
Artyom Fidler, Russian footballer
Artyom Filiposyan, Uzbek footballer
Artyom Fomin, Russian footballer
Artyom Fyodorov, Russian footballer
Artyom Kabanov, Russian footballer
Artyom Kazakov, Russian footballer
Artyom Kuchin, Kazakhstani referee
Artyom Kulesha, Russian footballer
Artyom Leonov, Russian footballer
Artyom Lopatkin, Russian footballer
Artyom Madilov, Russian footballer
Artyom Mikheyev, Russian footballer
Artyom Mitasov, Russian footballer
Artyom Molodtsov, Russian footballer
Artyom Moskvin, Russian footballer
Artyom Motov, Russian footballer
Artyom Pasko, Russian footballer
Artyom Pershin, Russian footballer
Artyom Petrenko, Russian footballer
Artyom Popov, Russian footballer
Artyom Prokhorov, Russian footballer
Artyom Pugolovkin, Russian ice hockey player
Artyom Rebrov, Russian footballer
Artyom Samsonov, Russian footballer, born 1989
Artyom Samsonov, Russian footballer, born 1994
Artyom Sapozhkov, Russian footballer
Artyom Senkevich, Belarusian ice hockey player
Artyom Serdyuk, Russian footballer
Artyom Shchadin, Russian footballer
Artyom Stepanov, Russian footballer
Artyom Timofeev, Russian chess player
Artyom Timofeyev, Russian footballer
Artyom Varakin, Russian footballer
Artyom Voronkin, Russian footballer
Artyom Zagrebin, Russian footballer

See also
Artyom, the main character of the books Metro 2033 and Metro 2035, as well as the games Metro 2033, Metro: Last Light, and Metro Exodus
Artyom Popov, a main character of the book Metro 2034.
Artemy
Artem
Artsyom

References

Russian masculine given names
Ukrainian masculine given names
Armenian masculine given names
Belarusian masculine given names